Spean Bridge is a village in the parish of Kilmonivaig, in Lochaber in the Highland region of Scotland.

The village takes its name from the Highbridge over the River Spean on General Wade's military road between Fort William and Fort Augustus, and not from Telford's bridge of 1819 which carries the A82 over the river  at the heart of the village.

The Highbridge Skirmish on 16 August 1745 was the first engagement of the Jacobite Rising of 1745.

It overlooks the training areas of the Commando Training Depot established in 1942 at Achnacarry Castle.

Transport
Lying in the Great Glen, Spean Bridge has road links north towards Inverness and south to Fort William, provided by the A82, and the A86 heads east to join the A9 at Kingussie.  The village is served also served by Spean Bridge railway station providing links to Glasgow, London, and Mallaig. Between 1903 and 1933 it offered a branch line service to Fort Augustus.

Sport
Lochaber Camanachd is the shinty club based in the village of Spean Bridge.

See also

Citations

External links
 

Highlands and Islands of Scotland
Populated places in Lochaber